Siamraptor is an extinct genus of carcharodontosaurian dinosaur, containing the single species S. suwati, known from the Khok Kruat Formation of Thailand. It is the first definitive named carcharodontosaurian species known from Southeast Asia.

Discovery 

Between 2007 and 2009, the Japan-Thailand Dinosaur Project carried out excavations at the village of  Saphan Hin, subdistrict Suranaree, Mueang Nakhon Ratchasima District, in Nakhon Ratchasima Province. The finds included bones from a theropod new to science.

In 2019, the type species Siamraptor suwati was named and described by Duangsuda Chokchaloemwon, Soki Hattori, Elena Cuesta, Pratueng Jintasakul, Masateru Shibata and Yoichi Azuma. The generic name is derived from "Siam", the former name of Thailand, and the Latin word raptor ("robber"). The specific name honours Suwat Liptapanlop, who supported the Northeastern Research Institute of Petrified Wood and Mineral Resources.

The holotype, NRRU-F01020008, was found in a layer of the Khok Kruat Formation dating from the Aptian. It consists of a rear right lower jaw including the surangular, prearticular and articular. Further material referred to S. suwati includes the isolated remains of at least three individuals, mostly consisting of skull and lower jaw fragments as well as a manual ungual, a series of three cervical vertebrae, two partial ischia, a caudal vertebra, two dorsal vertebral centra and a neural spine, a partial tibia and a left pedal phalanx.

Description 
The describing authors indicated some distinguishing traits. These are autapomorphies, unique derived characters, relative to the Allosauroidea. The jugal bone has a lower edge that is straight instead of convex or undulating while the front branch is high, even under the eye socket. The surangular bone has a deep oval excavation to the rear of its bone shelf and four rear surangular foramina, while other theropods possess at most two. A long narrow groove runs along the suture between the surangular and the prearticular bone. The notch in the suture between the articular and prearticular is pierced by a foramen. The front neck vertebrae possess an additional pneumatic foramen excavating the parapophysis, the lower rib contact. The neck vertebrae and rear back vertebrae have paired small foramina in the base of the neural spine.

References 

Carcharodontosauria
Aptian life
Early Cretaceous dinosaurs of Asia
Cretaceous Thailand
Fossils of Thailand
Fossil taxa described in 2019